Mohamed Mamdouh Abdelhamid El-Nady (born March 14, 1985) is an Egyptian swimmer, who specialized in sprint freestyle events. He was selected to the Egyptian swimming team at the 2008 Summer Olympics, finishing among the top 60 swimmers in the men's 50 m freestyle.

El-Nady competed for Egypt in the men's 50 m freestyle at the 2008 Summer Olympics in Beijing.
He finished with the fastest time and FINA B-standard in 22.36 at the Pan Arab Games one year earlier in Cairo, falling short of the Olympic qualifying cut by just a hundredth of a second (0.01). Swimming on the outside against the vastly experienced field in heat twelve, El Nady could not match his similar pre-Olympic effort with a clearly disappointing 23.92 to round out the field. El-Nady failed to advance to the semifinals, as he placed fifty-fourth out of 97 swimmers in the prelims.

References

External links
NBC Olympics Profile

1985 births
Living people
Egyptian male freestyle swimmers
Olympic swimmers of Egypt
Swimmers at the 2008 Summer Olympics
Islamic Solidarity Games medalists in swimming
Islamic Solidarity Games competitors for Egypt
20th-century Egyptian people
21st-century Egyptian people